"Dark Therapy" is the third and final single from Echobelly's second album On. It was released by the Britpop group in February 1996.

The song was included on both of the greatest hits albums that Echobelly have released; I Can't Imagine The World Without Me and The Best Of Echobelly. The song was also re-released acoustically by Glen Johansson and Sonya Madan under the name Calm of Zero. It appears on the EP Acoustic Sessions 1.

A music video was made for the song.

It reached 20 in the UK Singles Chart, making it their second highest charting single to date (behind Great Things). Despite this, however, Sonya believes it could have charted higher, had the label been more positive about the song. However, due to the issues the company were dealing with, they didn't really promote the single.

Track listing

CD

Tracks 2, 3 & 4 were re-released on both the expanded edition of On, 
Tracks 3 & 4 were re-released on the greatest hits album I Can't Imagine The World Without Me.

7" Vinyl

A 12" promo Vinyl was also released which only contains an extended version of Dark Therapy, and no other tracks. The song lasts 5:15.

Credits
Bass – James Harris
Drums – Andy Henderson 
Guitar – Glenn Johansson, Debbie Smith
Voice – Sonya Madan
Cello - Audrey Riley
Piano - Simon Lacey
Engineer – Jim Brumby
Producer - Paul Kolderie, Sean Slade, Glen Johansson, Simon Vinestock
Mixer - Simon Vinestock
Design/Art direction - Morgan Penn
Cover photography - Michael Heissner

References

1996 singles
Echobelly songs
1995 songs